Golden Jacob Mbunda  (5 January 1988 – 12 February 2019), known by his stage name Godzilla, was a Tanzanian recording artist, singer and songwriter.

Early life 
Godzilla and his two siblings were raised by their mother in Morogoro, after their dad died while he was only two years.

Career
In early 2007 Godzilla participated in the freestyle battle, he didn't win the first place, but that freestyle battle was a huge success for him as a platform.
Because it let him to be known and got him his first big radio interview and became one among the first rappers performed in big stages without any official single on radio.
In 2008 Godzilla joined Malaria No More in their Zinduka Campaign, a campaign aimed to eliminate malaria.
In January 2014 Godzilla released his first official mixtape that had 18 songs like Illumi-Naught, The Same, Freestyle, Boss, Tungi, Ready or not, cake, Otis, Happy Birthday, Freestyle feat. Joti, F**k with me you know I got it, Commercial, Maturation of Godzizi, Money feat. Gosby, Hight Tonight, Closer feat. Cliff mitindo and Lakuchumpa feat. Joti.

Discography
Singles
Salasala
Lakuchumpa
Otis
Kingzilla
Milele
Illumi-Naught
Nataka
Thank God
Karibu Yako
Nisome
You and I
Nobody
Poza maumivu
Stay
Hard work pays
Tungi

Music, awards and music tours
In 2009 Godzilla experienced the tour life, was among the artists that performed at the Serengeti fiesta tour in 2009, Tanzania's biggest nationwide music tour, covering various regions.
Godzilla performed on the same stage that international artist Busta rhymes performed.  
Godzilla performed at Serengeti fiesta tour again in 2010 and 2011, whereby Ludacris was the international artist on the final tour that took place in Dar es salaam. In 2012 he hit the same stage as Rick Ross did, the same as in 2013 and 2014.
In 2012 Godzilla was nominated for Kilimanjaro Tanzania Music awards for Best Hip hop Song of the Year, 
and in 2013 Godzilla was nominated for 3 Kilimanjaro Tanzania Music Awards for Best hip hop Artist, Best Collaboration, and Best Hip hop song of the Year for his song Kingzilla.
In 2012 and 2013 Godzilla was among the artists that performed at the Kili Music Tour, that was covering various regions and at the main event Kili Awards that took place at Mlimani City in Dar es Salaam.

Awards and nominations

References

 Ngoma za hip hop
 Ushindani hafifu
 Nikimnunulia mama angu ghorofa
 Wasanii wengi
 Tungi
 Poza maumivu
 gongamx
 Nataka
 Kideo
 Mzigo Mpya

Tanzanian musicians
1988 births
2019 deaths
Place of death missing
People from Morogoro Region
Godzilla (franchise)
 Tanzanian Bongo Flava musicians
 Swahili-language singers